Thomas Joseph Moyer (April 18, 1939 – April 2, 2010) was an American jurist and the chief justice of the Ohio Supreme Court from 1987 to 2010. A member of the Republican Party, he died suddenly on April 2, 2010, at age 70. The Thomas J. Moyer Ohio Judicial Center, headquarters of the Ohio Supreme Court, was named in his honor in 2004.

Pre-Supreme Court
Until his death, Moyer was the longest-serving state chief justice in the United States. Born in Sandusky, Ohio, he attended Sandusky High School and went on to receive both his undergraduate and law degree from The Ohio State University. He served as chairman of the board of directors of the O.S.U. Alumni Association, as well as the board of trustees of Franklin University.

From 1979 to 1987, Moyer served on the Tenth District Court of Appeals for Ohio, which covers Franklin County. Prior to his appointment, he served as the president of the Columbus Board of Education. During his tenure there, the board found itself in the middle of desegregation fights, chronicled in the book Getting Around Brown. He also served for four years as an executive assistant to Governor James A. Rhodes (R-Ohio) and eight years in private practice in Sandusky.

Moyer was married and lived in Columbus. He was re-elected in 1992, 1998, and 2004.

As judge
Moyer presided over the DeRolph decision dealing with school funding, as well as the late 1990s' legal battle over tort reform. 

Although a Republican, Moyer had a strong belief in the principles of stare decisis. In 2001, he created a task force on guardians ad litem in Ohio. In 2004, when the court moved into new quarters, some controversy ensued over the cost involved. On May 15, 2004, the building was dedicated by U.S. Chief Justice William Rehnquist.

Under Moyer's leadership, the court:
 Started the Off-Site Court program after taking office in 1987. The Court visits two local counties per year, and educates high school students about the judiciary. The Court has visited 50 counties, offering a chance to view proceedings to 28,000 Ohioans – 22,000 of whom are high school students.
 Revamped, in 1989, the statistical case reporting system for judges in the Rules of Superintendence (Sup.R. 37 Appendix A) to increase the accuracy and efficiency of reporting.  Created a separate statistical case reporting section at the Court.
 Amended, in 1996, the Rules for the Government of the Bar to create a process requiring lawyer referral services to register with the Court so the Court can facilitate public access to lawyers by placing this information on its Web site (see ).
 Revamped, in 2002, the rules governing the Rules for the Reporting of Opinions in Ohio to standardize the publication of opinions from the Supreme Court and the courts of appeals to increase public access and availability written opinions.
 Began, in March 2004, broadcasting live all Supreme Court Oral Arguments on cable TV and on the Internet. The cable signal reaches more than 5 million homes across Ohio. Ohio's courts are among only a small number of courts in the United States that broadcast all arguments live. All cases are also archived on the Internet.
 Put the Attorney Registration Database online in 2004 so citizens can access information about any Ohio attorney, including business address and phone number, date of birth, date of admission to practice, disciplinary history and CLE status.
 Put the entire docket online in 2005, allowing anyone at any time to check the status of a case, learn about new filings, and locate counsel information.
 Began, in 2006, the closed-captioning of all oral arguments to facilitate access by deaf and hard-of-hearing citizens and to enable public access to unofficial transcripts of all proceedings in a searchable database. Ohio is one of only two state courts in the country with this service.

References

1939 births
2010 deaths
Judges of the Ohio District Courts of Appeals
Justices of the Ohio Supreme Court
Ohio State University alumni
Ohio State University Moritz College of Law alumni
Politicians from Sandusky, Ohio
Lawyers from Columbus, Ohio
Chief Justices of the Ohio Supreme Court
Ohio Republicans
Burials at Green Lawn Cemetery (Columbus, Ohio)
School board members in Ohio
20th-century American judges
20th-century American lawyers